Benjamin "Benjie" Lewis (born October 11, 1982 in Miami) is an animal health visionary, entrepreneur, and former Olympian. He is the Chief Strategy Officer of The One Health Company, and previously served as the CEO of 4Vets.

Benjie was born and raised in North Miami Beach, FL. Ben was the 2nd of 4 children born to Dr. Sylvan and Carol Lewis. He attended Sinai Academy and Hillel in North Miami before being selected to move to Lake Placid to train for the Olympics. Benjie completed high school at the National Sports Academy. 

Ben always had a passion for kayaking and started training with Angel Perez (Cuban/USA Olympian) at the Miami Rowing Club on Key Biscayne, FL at the age of 13. At 16 Ben was selected by Paul Podgorski to live in the Olympic Training Center in Lake Placid, NY, to train fulltime. At 18, Ben started studying Biology at Dartmouth College in New Hampshire. At 21, Ben was selected to compete in the 2004 Summer Olympics, and represented the USA in the Men's K-1 1000 meter event. 

Following graduation and competing in the Olympics, Ben attended The Wharton School and received an MBA in HealthCare Management. Ben also attended the University of Pennsylvania School of Veterinary Medicine for 3+ years (of 4 years) but left early to pursue his entrepreneurial dreams of innovating in animal health. Ben co-founded 4Vets in Sao Paulo, Brazil, with his Wharton Healthcare Management classmate. 4Vets was sold and Ben returned to the USA and started The One Health Company with his wife, Christina Lopes. 

Ben is married with two children.

See also
 World Fit

References
Sports-Reference.com profile

1982 births
Sportspeople from Miami
American male canoeists
Canoeists at the 2004 Summer Olympics
Living people
Olympic canoeists of the United States
Pan American Games silver medalists for the United States
Pan American Games medalists in canoeing
Medalists at the 2003 Pan American Games
Canoeists at the 2003 Pan American Games